Elizabeth Baidu (born 28 April 1978) is a Ghanaian women's international footballer who plays as a defender. She was a member of the Ghana women's national football team. She was part of the team at the 1999 FIFA Women's World Cup and at the 2003 FIFA Women's World Cup. On club level she played for Bluna Ladies in Ghana.

References

1978 births
Living people
Ghanaian women's footballers
Ghana women's international footballers
Place of birth missing (living people)
1999 FIFA Women's World Cup players
Women's association football defenders
2003 FIFA Women's World Cup players